This list contains songs written by American singer-songwriter Bob Dylan, including those where he is credited as co-author. The list omits traditional songs where Dylan has claimed arranger's copyright.

See also
List of Bob Dylan songs based on earlier tunes
List of artists who have covered Bob Dylan songs

References

Lists of songs by songwriters